Aliens in the Family is an American science fantasy sitcom that aired on ABC from March 15 to August 31, 1996, conceived as part of its TGIF lineup.

Premise
The show was about single dad Doug Brody (John Bedford Lloyd), who is abducted by single alien mom Cookie (Margaret Trigg). The two fall in love, get married, and try to live a normal life on Earth as a mixed family.

Cast
John Bedford Lloyd as Doug Brody
 Margaret Trigg as Cookie Brody
 Paige Tiffany as Heather Brody
Chris Marquette as Adam Brody
Julie Dretzin as Sally Hagen

Puppeteers
Alice Dinnean as Snizzy (face and voice)
Michael Gilden as Snizzy (body)
John Kennedy as Bobut (face)
Bruce Lanoil as Spit (face)
Peter Linz as Varch, Elder of the Nertron Galactic Federation (in "Respect Your Elders"), Red Yukkle (in "Dissected and Neglected")
Joey Mazzarino as Spit (voice), Green and Yellow Yukkles (in "Dissected and Neglected")
David Rudman as Bobut (body and voice), Orange and Purple Yukkles (in "Dissected and Neglected")
Michelan Sisti as Spit (body)

Production
The series was created, written and executive produced by Andy and Susan Borowitz. Brian Henson, son of Jim Henson, also served as co-executive producer. The series theme song was written and performed by Todd Rundgren. The series was shot in its entirety at Lifetime Studios in New York City.

Episodes

Cancellation
The show premiered on March 15, 1996; ABC pulled the series from its TGIF lineup after two weeks, replacing the show's scheduled third airing with re-runs of other TGIF programs. The show did not return for over four months and aired the rest of its episodes on Saturday mornings in the summer of 1996.

Jaleel White, who starred as Steve Urkel on another TGIF program (Family Matters), was a vocal critic of TGIF adding Jim Henson programs onto the TGIF block (Aliens in the Family debuted the same year as Muppets Tonight) and speculated that their addition ruined the block's credibility by changing its target demographic from whole families to children.

References

External links
 
 

1996 American television series debuts
1996 American television series endings
1990s American comic science fiction television series
1990s American sitcoms
American Broadcasting Company original programming
American fantasy television series
American television shows featuring puppetry
English-language television shows
Television series about alien visitations
Television series about families
Television series by The Jim Henson Company
TGIF (TV programming block)
Television series created by Andy Borowitz
Television series created by Susan Borowitz
Television shows set in Minnesota